The 2012 Georgia State Panthers softball team represented Georgia State University in the 2012 NCAA Division I softball season. The Panthers competed in the Colonial Athletic Association and were led by second-year head coach Roger Kincaid. Georgia State played its home games at the Robert E. Heck Softball Complex in Panthersville, Georgia.

Roster

Schedule 

! style="background:#0000FF;color:white;"| Regular season
|- valign="top" 

|- align="center" bgcolor="#ccffcc"
| 1 || February 11 ||  || Bob Heck Field || 3-2 || 1-0 || -
|- align="center" bgcolor="#ccffcc"
| 2 || February 11 ||   || Bob Heck Field || 11-2 || 2-0 || -
|- align="center" bgcolor="#ccffcc"
| 3 || February 12 ||   || Bob Heck Field || 7-5 || 3-0 || -
|- align="center" bgcolor="#ffbbb"
| 4 || February 12 || Longwood || Bob Heck Field || 7-11 || 3-1 || -
|- align="center" bgcolor="#ccffcc"
| 5 || February 15 ||   || Statesboro, GA || 1-0 || 4-1 || -
|- align="center" bgcolor="#ffbbb"
| 6 || February 15 || Georgia Southern || Statesboro, GA || 1-4 || 4-2 || -
|- align="center" bgcolor="#ccffcc"
| 7 || February 18 ||   || Bob Heck Field || 5-1 || 5-2 || -
|- align="center" bgcolor="#ccffcc"
| 8 || February 19 ||   || Bob Heck Field || 7-0 || 6-2 || -
|- align="center" bgcolor="#ccffcc"
| 9 || February 19 ||   || Bob Heck Field || 1-0 || 7-2 || -
|- align="center" bgcolor="#ffbbb"
| 10 || February 22 ||   || Bob Heck Field || 1-9 || 7-3 || -
|- align="center" bgcolor="#ffbbb"
| 11 || February 24 ||   || Woodstock, GA || 2-5 || 7-4 || -
|- align="center" bgcolor="#ccffcc"
| 12 || February 24 ||   || Woodstock, GA || 12-0 || 8-4 || -
|- align="center" bgcolor="#ccffcc"
| 13 || February 25 ||   || Woodstock, GA || 4-3 || 9-4 || -
|- align="center" bgcolor="#ccffcc"
| 14 || February 25 ||   || Woodstock, GA || 9-6 || 10-4 || -
|- align="center" bgcolor="#ccffcc"
| 15 || February 26 ||   || Woodstock, GA || 5-0 || 11-4 || -
|- align="center" bgcolor="#ffbbb"
| 16 || February 29 ||   || Bob Heck Field || 2-1 || 12-4 || -
|-

|- align="center" bgcolor="#ccffcc"
| 17 || March 2 ||  || Woodstock, GA || 8-7 || 13-4 || -
|- align="center" bgcolor="#ffbbb"
| 18 || March 2 ||   || Woodstock, GA || 2-3 || 13-5 || -
|- align="center" bgcolor="#ffffff"
| 19 || March 3 ||   || Woodstock, GA || Cancelled || - || -
|- align="center" bgcolor="#ccffcc"
| 20 || March 3 ||  || Woodstock, GA || 4-0 || 14-5 || -
|- align="center" bgcolor="#ccffcc"
| 21 || March 4 ||   || Woodstock, GA || 5-3 || 15-5 || -
|- align="center" bgcolor="#ccffcc"
| 22 || March 4 ||  || Woodstock, GA || 2-0 || 16-5 || -
|- align="center" bgcolor="#ccffcc"
| 23 || March 8 ||   || Jacksonville, AL || 4-2 || 17-5 || -
|- align="center" bgcolor="#ccffcc"
| 24 || March 8 ||  Jacksonville State || Jacksonville, AL || 5-3 || 18-5 || -
|- align="center" bgcolor="#ffbbb"
| 25 || March 11 ||   || Bob Heck Field || 2-3 || 18-6 || -
|- align="center" bgcolor="#ccffcc"
| 26 || March 11 ||  Mercer || Bob Heck Field || 2-1 || 19-6 || -
|- align="center" bgcolor="#ccffcc"
| 27 || March 17 ||   || Kennesaw, GA || 3-1 || 20-6 || -
|- align="center" bgcolor="#ffbbb"
| 28 || March 17 ||  Kennesaw State || Kennesaw, GA || 1-3 || 20-7 || -
|- align="center" bgcolor="#ffbbb"
| 29 || March 21 ||   || Athens, GA || 0-6 || 20-8 || -
|- align="center" bgcolor="#ffbbb"
| 30 || March 24 ||   || Bob Heck Field || 6-8 || 20-9 || 0-1
|- align="center" bgcolor="#ffbbb"
| 31 || March 24 || Hofstra || Bob Heck Field || 0-16 || 20-10 || 0-2
|- align="center" bgcolor="#ffbbb"
| 32 || March 25 ||  Hofstra || Bob Heck Field || 1-4 || 20-11 || 0-3
|- align="center" bgcolor="#ccffcc"
| 33 || March 31 ||   || Bob Heck Field || 4-0 || 21-11 || 1-3
|- align="center" bgcolor="#ccffcc"
| 34 || March 31 ||  Towson || Bob Heck Field || 8-1 || 22-11 || 2-3
|-

|- align="center" bgcolor="#ccffcc"
| 35 || April 1 ||  Towson || Bob Heck Field || 4-0 || 23-11 || 3-3
|- align="center" bgcolor="#ccffcc"
| 36 || April 4 ||  Furman || Greenville, SC || 2-0 || 24-11 || 3-3
|- align="center" bgcolor="#ccffcc"
| 37 || April 4 ||  Furman || Greenville, SC || 7-2 || 25-11 || 3-3
|- align="center" bgcolor="#ccffcc"
| 38 || April 6 ||   || Wilmington, NC || 8-0 || 26-11 || 4-3
|- align="center" bgcolor="#ccffcc"
| 39 || April 6 ||  UNC Wilmington || Wilmington, NC || 6-0 || 27-11 || 5-3
|- align="center" bgcolor="#ccffcc"
| 40 || April 7 ||  UNC Wilmington || Wilmington, NC || 4-1 || 28-11 || 6-3
|- align="center" bgcolor="#ffbbb"
| 41 || April 11 ||  Georgia Tech || Atlanta, GA || 2-3 || 28-12 || 6-3
|- align="center" bgcolor="#ccffcc"
| 42 || April 14 ||   || Bob Heck Field || 3-2 || 29-12 || 7-3
|- align="center" bgcolor="#ccffcc"
| 43 || April 14 ||  Drexel Dragons || Bob Heck Field || 8-0 || 30-12 || 8-3
|- align="center" bgcolor="#ccffcc"
| 44 || April 15 ||  Drexel Dragons || Bob Heck Field || 6-1 || 31-12 || 9-3
|- align="center" bgcolor="#ccffcc"
| 45 || April 19 ||   || Tuscaloosa, AL || 5-1 || 32-12 || 9-3
|- align="center" bgcolor="#ccffcc"
| 46 || April 21 ||   || Newark, DE || 7-0 || 33-12 || 10-3
|- align="center" bgcolor="#ffbbb"
| 47 || April 21 ||  Delaware || Newark, DE || 1-3 || 33-13 || 10-4
|- align="center" bgcolor="#ffffff"
| 48 || April 22 ||  Delaware || Newark, DE || Cancelled || - || -
|- align="center" bgcolor="#ffbbb"
| 49 || April 28 ||   || Bob Heck Field || 1-4 || 33-14 || 10-5
|- align="center" bgcolor="#ccffcc"
| 50 || April 28 ||  James Madison || Bob Heck Field || 5-1 || 34-14 || 11-5
|- align="center" bgcolor="#ffbbb"
| 51 || April 29 ||  James Madison || Bob Heck Field || 1-3 || 34-15 || 11-6
|-

|- align="center" bgcolor="#ffbbb"
| 52 || May 4 ||   || Fairfax, VA || 2-3 || 34-16 || 11-7
|- align="center" bgcolor="#ccffcc"
| 53 || May 4 || George Mason || Fairfax, VA || 6-0 || 35-16 || 12-7
|- align="center" bgcolor="#ccffcc"
| 54 || May 5 ||  George Mason || Fairfax, VA || 2-0 || 36-16 || 13-7
|-

|-
! style="background:#0000FF;color:white;"| Post-Season
|-

|- align="center" bgcolor="#ccffcc"
| 55 || May 10 || James Madison || Hempstead, NY || 7-4 || 37-16 || 14-7 || 1-0
|- align="center" bgcolor="#ffbbb"
| 56 || May 11 || Hofstra || Hempstead, NY || 0-1 || 37-17 || 14-8 || 1-1
|- align="center" bgcolor="#ccffcc"
| 57 || May 11 || James Madison || Hempstead, NY || 9-1 || 38-17 || 15-8 || 2-1
|- align="center" bgcolor="#ffbbb"
| 58 || May 12 || Hofstra || Hempstead, NY || 1-9 || 38-18 || 15-9 || 2-2
|-

|-
|

References 

Georgia State
Georgia State Panthers softball seasons